Terrells Creek is a  long 3rd order tributary to the Haw River, left bank in Chatham County, North Carolina.

Variant names
According to the Geographic Names Information System, it has also been known historically as:  
Ferrell Creek
Ferrells Creek
Tyrrells Creek

Course
Terrells Creek rises about 1 mile southeast of White Cross, North Carolina in Orange County and then flows south into Chatham County to the Haw River about 4 miles upstream of Bynum.

Watershed
Terrells Creek drains  of area, receives about 47.6 in/year of precipitation, and has a wetness index of 402.62 and is about 77% forested.

See also
List of rivers of North Carolina

References

Additional maps

Rivers of North Carolina
Rivers of Chatham County, North Carolina
Rivers of Orange County, North Carolina